The Merlion Cup is an international basketball tournament, in which clubs, national teams and selections take part. It is organised by the Basketball Association of Singapore.

History
The inaugural Merlion Cup was hosted in 1984 with the Chinese national team winning over Spanish team Madrid Estudiantes. The tournament was held next year but the 1986 edition was cancelled due to sponsorship issues amidst a recession.

The tournament was resumed in 1987 and was held annually until the 1996 with the 1993 edition not held due to the 1993 Southeast Asian Games and the 1995 edition being cancelled.

The Gay World Stadium later renamed as the Geyland Indoor Stadium has been used as the venue of the tournament from the inaugural until the 1987 tournament. From the 1989 until the 1996 edition the Singapore Indoor Stadium was used as the venue of the basketball meet.

The Merlion Cup was not to be held again until 2016 when the BAS decided to revive the tournament. Two more editions in two years is planned by BAS citing the success of the 2016 edition attributing healthy attendances throughout the competition.

Results

Medal tally

By country

Notes

References

 
International basketball competitions hosted by Singapore
Recurring sporting events established in 1984
1984 establishments in Singapore
Basketball competitions in Asia between national teams